Edgar Nanne (born 22 November 1952) is a Guatemalan rower. He competed at the 1980 Summer Olympics and the 1984 Summer Olympics.

References

External links
 

1952 births
Living people
Guatemalan male rowers
Olympic rowers of Guatemala
Rowers at the 1980 Summer Olympics
Rowers at the 1984 Summer Olympics
Place of birth missing (living people)